Hestavíg was an entertainment activity during the Viking Age in the Icelandic Commonwealth (930–1262), presumably a sport consisting of a brutal and bloody confrontation between two stallions, egged on by their masters, which mainly served to choose the best specimens for breeding. It was a cultural event of great importance and sometimes behaved verbal and physical confrontations among the spectators. The triumph of a champion or the other could impact socially and politically in the pacts and alliances between goði (chieftains) and bóndi (homesteaders), as testified in the Norse sagas. The site where these battles held was a neutral place used to strengthen friendship or treat issues among rivals. It was also an opportunity for courtship between young couples. Sometimes rivalries raised among participants and ended in bloody conflicts. Some examples appear in the Njáls saga (chapter 59) and  Víga-Glúms saga (chapters 13-14).

The origin of the activity came possibly from Norway. Sometimes Icelanders exported stallions specially trained for competitions on the continent.

Skeið 
Skeið was another activity related to horses. It was a popular race competition from mainland Scandinavia.

Popular culture
Hestavíg is featured in the Icelandic viking film In the Shadow of the Raven.

References 

Viking practices
Obsolete blood sports
Horses in culture
Early Germanic culture
Animal cruelty incidents
Animal combat organized by humans